Tony Cummings is the founding editor of the magazine Cross Rhythms.

Biography 
Cummings' journalistic career started in 1963. He started a black music fanzine originally called Soul, then Soul Music Monthly, and finally Shout. By 1971, he was writing occasionally for Record Mirror. In 1973, he joined Black Music magazine as a staff writer, eventually becoming editor. Over the next few years, he interviewed artists such as Stevie Wonder, Earth Wind & Fire, Michael Jackson and many more. He stopped writing for the magazine in 1976, and converted to Christianity in 1980. Within a year he was married, and began to write for the Christian magazine Buzz. Cummings was offered the position of assistant editorship, and interviewed people such as Rev. Ian Paisley and Cliff Richard.

During his years with Cross Rhythms, Cummings has interviewed multiple artists. He also mentored both Daniel Bedingfield and Natasha Bedingfield during their formative musical careers. He has produced albums for Word Records, as well as a number of charity records. Among these, was the Agents of Grace compilation, in aid of the suffering in Sudan. He has given seminars at various Christian festivals, such as Spring Harvest and Greenbelt Festival.

Cross Rhythms magazine 
After Buzz magazine ended in 1986, Cummings began working with Cross Rhythms magazine in 1990. Publication of the magazine was taken over by Cornerstone House in 1991, owned by Chris Cole, who was also CEO of the radio ministry that later became named Cross Rhythms. By 1995, the publication had a readership of about 15,000. In December 1993, the magazine began giving away a free cassette on the cover, featuring tracks from the latest Christian artists. In February 1999, the format changed to a free CD. Around 2000, an online version of the magazine started. By 2005, it became online only, after the paper version started to run up debts. The website, of which the music news, articles and interviews play a huge part, is currently the UK's most visited Christian website.

References 

Cross Rhythms
British male journalists
British magazine editors
English Christians
Living people
Converts to Christianity
Year of birth missing (living people)